The Africa Movie Academy Award for Best Animation is an annual merit by the Africa Film Academy to reward the best animated films for the year.

See also 

 List of animation awards

References

Lists of award winners
Africa Movie Academy Awards
Animation awards